The 2009 European Table Tennis Championships was held in Stuttgart, Germany from 13–20 October 2009. Venue for the competition was Porsche-Arena.

Medal summary

Men's events

Women's events

References
 

2009
European Championships
International sports competitions hosted by Germany
Table Tennis European Championships
September 2009 sports events in Europe
21st century in Stuttgart
Sports competitions in Stuttgart
2000s in Baden-Württemberg
Table tennis competitions in Germany